The MIDI Manufacturers Association (MMA) is a non-profit trade organization where companies work together to create MIDI standards that assure compatibility among MIDI products. The MMA is a U.S. organization established in 1985 by the original developers of the MIDI 1.0 Specification in 1983. Since 1985 the MMA has produced 11 new specifications and adopted 38 sets of enhancements to MIDI.

See also 
Association of Musical Electronics Industry
Show control
Comparison of MIDI standards
Standard MIDI File
DLS format
XMF

References

External links 
MIDI Manufacturers Association
Interview with President, Tom White NAMM Oral History Library, January 27, 2013.

MIDI
Organizations established in 1985
1985 establishments in the United States